Daniele Marco Scardina (born 2 April 1992) is an Italian professional boxer.

Career 
Scardina was born in Rozzano, in the Milan metropolitan area. He made his pro debut at the age of 22 in Santo Domingo. In 2013 he won a Golden Glove and participated to the World serie of boxing as well as the Talent League.

In 2015 he and his brother Giovanni decide to move to the United States. Scardina trained at the 5th Street Gym in Miami with Dino Spencer.

In March 2019 he won IBF International super-middleweight title, defeating Henri Kekalainen with a unanimous decision.

Personal life 
Daniele Scardina is a Pentecostal.

Professional boxing record

References 

Italian male boxers
Living people
1992 births
Super-middleweight boxers
Italian Pentecostals
Boxers from Milan